Patrick Darcy is the name of:

 Patrick D'Arcy (1598–1668), Irish nationalist
 Patrick d'Arcy (1725–1779), Irish mathematician and soldier
 Pat Darcy (born 1950), American baseball player